Lonnie Lynn Jr. (May 24, 1943 – September 12, 2014), nicknamed "Pops", was an American basketball player.

Life and career
Lynn was born on May 24, 1943 in Chicago, the son of Mabel and Lonnie Lynn, a construction worker.

At 6'7" and 215 lb, he was a forward and played basketball at DuSable High School on Chicago's south side before moving on to Wilberforce University and Upper Iowa University.

Lynn was drafted by the St. Louis Hawks in the 12th round of the 1966 NBA draft and later played one season for the Pittsburgh Pipers of the American Basketball Association in 1969–70, averaging 5.0 points and 5.0 rebounds per game.

Once known to Chicagoans for his play at DuSable High School, Lonnie Lynn gathered a following in the rap world. Father of rapper Common, Lynn performed on several of his son's albums.

On his son's records, Lynn shared opinions, experiences and wisdom to a younger hip hop audience in spoken word poetry format. Many of these appearances, in particular "Pops Rap" on Resurrection, feature Lynn discussing the hippie ideals that have found their way into hip hop culture. In an article for National Public Radio, journalist Robert Siegel wrote of Lonnie "Pops" Lynn:

Lynn had six other children aside from Common.

Although he was reared in Chicago, Lynn was greatly affected by visits to the South during his youth and the brutal murder of Emmett Till, a fellow Chicagoan.

Death
Lynn died of prostate cancer on September 12, 2014, at the age of 71.

References

External links
Lynn at databasebasketball.com
NPR Interview: 'Pops' Contributes to Rapper Common's Cause

1943 births
2014 deaths
20th-century African-American sportspeople
21st-century African-American people
African-American basketball players
American men's basketball players
Basketball players from Chicago
Denver Rockets players
Pittsburgh Pipers players
Small forwards
St. Louis Hawks draft picks
Upper Iowa Peacocks men's basketball players
Wilberforce Bulldogs men's basketball players